Sandhipur  is a village in Chanditala I community development block of Srirampore subdivision in Hooghly district in the Indian state of West Bengal.

Geography

Gram panchayat
Villages in Shiakhala gram panchayat are: Chak Tajpur, Madhupur, Paschim Tajpur, Patul, Raghunathpur, Sandhipur and Sehakhala.

Demographics
As per 2011 Census of India, Sandhipur had a total population of 2.186 of which 1,118 (51%) were males and 1,068 (49%) were females. Population below 6 years was 285. The total number of literates in Sandhipur was 1,551 (81.59% of the population over 6 years).

References 

Villages in Chanditala I CD Block